Henry Vaughan Lanchester (9 August 1863 – 16 January 1953) was a British architect working in London. He served as editor of The Builder, was a co-founder of the Town Planning Institute and a recipient of the Royal Gold Medal.

Biography
Lanchester was born in St John's Wood, London. His father, Henry Jones Lanchester (1816–1890), was an established architect, and his younger brother, Frederick W. Lanchester (1868–1946), was to become an engineer. He was articled to his father, but also worked in the offices of London architects F.J. Eadle, T.W. Cutler and George Sherrin from 1884 to 1894. He studied at the Royal Academy in 1886, won the Aldwinckle Prize and, in 1889, the Owen Jones Studentship.

His first architectural work was Kingswood House, Sydenham, in 1892, and he established his own practice in 1894. His first fully independent work in 1896 were offices in Old Street, for Messrs Bovril Ltd. He formed a partnership in 1896 with James A. Stewart (1865 or 6-1908) and Edwin Alfred Rickards (1872–1920). As Lanchester, Stewart and Rickards, in 1897 the firm won the competition to build Cardiff City Hall.

Lanchester was editor of The Builder from 1910 to 1912. In 1912, he visited India and prepared a report on the planning of New Delhi as well as preparing plans for Madras. In 1914 he was one of the founder members of the Town Planning Institute in London. He formed a new partnership in 1923, Lanchester, Lucas & Lodge, with Thomas Geoffry Lucas and Thomas Arthur Lodge.

He was appointed Professor of Architecture at University College London, and in 1934 Lanchester was awarded the Royal Gold Medal of the Royal Institute of British Architects.

Architectural works
Cardiff City Hall (1897–1905)
Cardiff Law Courts (1901–04)
Deptford Town Hall, London (1902–07; today part of Goldsmiths, University of London)
Methodist Central Hall, Westminster (1905–11)
Third Church of Christ Scientist, Curzon Street, Westminster (1910–12) tower (1931–32)
The Post Office Lucknow (1916)
Housing schemes in Portsmouth & Weybridge (1920–23)
Council Building for the United Provinces, Lucknow (1921)
Planned new suburbs in Rangoon (1921)
Planned new suburbs in Zanzibar (1922)
Harrogate Hospital (1925)
Hospital Cairo (1927)
Parkinson Building, Leeds University (1927–1951)
Umaid Bhawan Palace, Jodhpur, India (1929–43)

List of published work
Town Planning in Madras (1918)
Zanzibar a Study in Tropical Town Planning (1923)
Fischer von Erlach (1924)
Talks on Town Planning (1924)
The Art of Town Planning (1925)
Outline of Studies in Town Planning (1944)

Gallery of work

References 

 Page 232 Edwardian Architecture: A Biographical Dictionary, A. Stuart Gray 2nd Edition 1988
 Page 9, Directory of British Architects 1834-1914 Volume 2: L-Z, Antonia Brodie, Alison Felstead, Jonathan Franklin, Leslie Pinfield and Jane Oldfield, 2001 Continuum
 Chapter IX H.V. Lanchester, Representative British Architects of the Present Day, C.H. Reilly, 1931 B.T. Batsford Ltd

1863 births
1953 deaths
20th-century English architects
Recipients of the Royal Gold Medal
Architects from London